The Treaty of Stensby was an agreement between King Valdemar II of Denmark and the Teutonic Order, signed on 7 June 1238 in Stensby, Denmark, and confirmed by Innocent IV in September 1243. The arrangement transferred northern maritime Estonia to the Kingdom of Denmark in exchange for military support.

Backgrounds 
From May 1223 to November 1225, Count Henry of Schwerin maintained captive King Valdemar II of Denmark and his son Valdemar the Young. During that time, Denmark lost power in the Baltic region.

In 1225, Denmark transferred the authority of Estonia to William of Modena. However, the Livonian Brothers of the Sword took possession of the territory and refused to cede.

In February 1236, Pope Gregory IX resolved that the Livonian Brothers were to cede Reval, Jerwia, Harria, and Vironia to the Danish king. However, the Swordbrothers were defeated in the Battle of Saule and was incorporated into the Teutonic Order after.

Treaty content and signing 
William of Modena persuaded the Teutonic Order to follow the papal resolution to return northern Estonia to Danes. The papal legate met with representatives of Denmark and the Teutonic Order in Stensby. The Teutonic Order agreed to return Reval, Jerwia, Harria, and Vironia to King Valdemar II.

The Danish King donated Jerwia to the order in perpetuity as penitence and agreed to support the campaigns of the order. The Danish King was to retain two-thirds of future conquests. Meanwhile, the order would keep one-third.

In September 1243, Innocent IV confirmed the Treaty of Stensby.

The Treaty of Stensby allowed to the Danes and the Teutonic Order to collaborate in crusades against Novgorod and Pskov, and give to Denmark the legal foundation to rule in the north of Estonia.

References 

1238 in Europe
1230s treaties
Northern Crusades
Teutonic Order
Treaties of Denmark
13th century in Denmark
13th century in Estonia
Livonian Order